Navestock Side is a hamlet near the A128 road, in the Navestock civil parish of the Brentwood District, in the county of Essex, England. It is about three miles from the town of Brentwood. It has a small country house called Abbotswick.

References 
Essex A-Z (page 95)

Hamlets in Essex
Borough of Brentwood